Zion Matriculation Higher Secondary School is a chain of schools in Chennai, India. In June 1986, Dr. N. Vijayan founded the school. It is established and managed by the Zion Educational Trust.

References

Zion Matriculation Higher Secondary School - LinkedIn

External links
 Zion Matriculation Higher Secondary School

Primary schools in Tamil Nadu
High schools and secondary schools in Chennai
Schools in Kanchipuram district
Educational institutions established in 1986
1986 establishments in Tamil Nadu